The Canadian Ecology Centre (CEC) is an outdoor education complex located within Samuel de Champlain Provincial Park, near the town of Mattawa, Ontario.

Basic Description 
The Canadian Ecology Centre site consists of a main building and several smaller cabins on a tract of land within Samuel de Champlain Provincial Park. The CEC is a non-profit organization and was initially supported by proponents within the logging and wood industries, such as Tembec, as well as by various levels of government, NGOs, and public donors to get the Centre off the ground. The CEC facilities, while contemporary in both age and design, are constructed almost entirely out of wood.

The CEC is primarily an educational and research centre, where courses on a wide variety of subjects ranging from local culture and history to biology and science to forestry management and mining are offered to the public. The site is also equipped with high-speed internet access, and can be rented out as a wedding venue, conference or meeting centre. Cabins can also be rented for a nightly rate as an alternative to "tenting it" in the park.

The centre, like much of the surrounding communities, is almost fully bilingual and offers most programs in English and French.

The CEC is also the  headquarters  for the Canadian Institute of Forestry.

High School Credit Courses 
By far the best-known aspect of the CEC, however, is Eco-Camp, which is a summer program offering academic credit to high school students. Formal two-week courses in subjects such as Science, Biology, Environmental Science and Geography are available. The program is residential, and students live on-site for the duration. The most popular programs, a grade 11 and 12 biology courses, are almost invariably booked solid even with two back-to-back offerings of the course.

Professional Development and Teacher Tours 
The CEC offers a variety of Professional Development opportunities throughout the year, including the summer months.  Take part in single or multi-day programs that are designed and developed to provide hands-on, informative and engaging learning opportunities as well as opportunities to network with professionals and receive great resources and experiences that will transform and enhance career goals and personal development.

Training and certifications are available for professionals in a variety of fields and areas of interest.

External links 
 

Environment of Canada
Mattawa, Ontario
Buildings and structures in Nipissing District
Environmental educational institutions
Education in Nipissing District